A quinone methide is a type of conjugated organic compound that contain a cyclohexadiene with a carbonyl and an exocyclic methylidene or extended alkene unit. It is analogous to a quinone, but having one of the double bonded oxygens replaced with a carbon.  The carbonyl and methylidene are usually oriented either ortho or para to each other. There are some examples of transient synthetic meta quinone methides.

Properties
Quinone methides are cross-conjugated rather than aromatic. Nucleophilic addition at the exo-cyclic double bond will result in rearomatisation, making such reactions highly favourable. As a result, quinone methides are excellent, electrophilic Michael acceptors, react quickly with nucleophiles and can be easily reduced. They are able to act as radical scavengers via a similar process, a behaviour exploited by certain polymerisation inhibitors. Quinone methides are more polar than quinones, and therefore more chemically reactive. Simple unhindered quinone methides are short lived reactive intermediates that are not stable enough to be isolated under normal circumstances, they will trimerise in the absence of nucleophiles. Sterically hindered quinone methides can be sufficiently stable to be isolated, with some examples being commercially available.

Preparation
Quinone methides are often prepared by oxidation of the corresponding ortho or para cresol.

Quinone methides can be produced in aqueous solution by photochemical dehydration of o-hydroxybenzyl alcohols (i.e. salicyl alcohol).

Occurrence and applications
Quinones methides are commonly invoked in biochemistry, but are rarely observed as long-lived intermediates.

Biosynthesis of dehydroglycine
Quinone methide itself arises by the degradation of tyrosine, leading ultimately to p-cresol. Various quinone methides are directly involved in the process of lignification (creation of complex lignin polymers) in plants.

Quinone methides have been implicated as the ultimate cytotoxins responsible for the effects of such agents as antitumor drugs, antibiotics, and DNA alkylators. Oxidation to a reactive quinone methide is the mechanistic basis of many phenolic anti-cancer drugs.

Celastrol is a triterpenoid quinone methide isolated from Tripterygium wilfordii (Thunder of God vine) and Celastrus regelii that exhibits antioxidant (15 times the potency of α-tocopherol), anti-inflammatory, anticancer, and insecticidal  activities.

Pristimerin, the methyl ester of celasterol, is a triterpenoid quinone methide isolated from Maytenus heterophylla that displays antitumor and antiviral  activities. Pristimerin has also been found to have a contraceptive effect due to its inhibiting effect on the calcium channel of sperm (CatSper).

Taxodone and its oxidized rearrangement product, taxodione, are diterpenoid quinone methides found in Taxodium distichum (bald cypress), Rosmarinus officinalis (rosemary), several Salvia species and other plants, that display anticancer, antibacterial, antioxidant, antifungal, insecticide, and antifeedant  activities.

Maytenoquinone, an isomer of taxodione, is a biologically active quinone methide found in Maytenus dispermus.

Kendomycin is an antitumor antibacterial quinone methide macrolide first isolated from the bacterium Streptomyces violaceoruber. It has potent activity as an endothelin receptor antagonist and anti-osteoporosis agent.

Elansolid A3 is a quinone methide from the bacterium Chitinophaga sancti that displays antibiotic activity. Antibacterial quinone methides, 20-epi-isoiguesterinol, 6-oxoisoiguesterin, isoiguesterin and isoiguesterinol were found in Salacia madagascariensis. Quinone methides tingenone and netzahualcoyonol were isolated from Salacia petenensis. Nortriterpenoid quinone methide amazoquinone and (7S, 8S)-7-hydroxy-7,8-dihydro-tingenone were isolated from Maytenus amazonica. An antimicrobial quinone methide, 15 alpha-hydroxypristimerin, was isolated from a South American medicinal plant, Maytenus scutioides.

Quinone dimethides
A quinone dimethide (or "xylylene") is a compound with the formula C6H4(=CH2)2. Thus they are related to quinone monomethides (the topic of this article) by replacing the keto group with methylidene. A well studied example is tetracyanoquinodimethane.

References

External links
Formation and Stability of Simple Quinone Methides
Quinone methide intermediates in organic Photochemistry
Reactive intermediates. Some chemistry of quinone methides

 
Functional groups